The Polish Theatre in Szczecin (Polish: Teatr Polski w Szczecinie) is a repertory theatre in Szczecin (Poland), established in 1946 in the building of a former masonic lodge.

References 

Theatre companies in Poland
Masonic buildings